Political opportunism refers to the attempt to maintain  political support, or to increase political  influence - possibly in a way which disregards relevant ethical or political  principles.

History
The political philosophy of Niccolò Machiavelli as described in The Prince is often regarded as a classic manual of opportunist scheming, and indeed a Machiavellian is nowadays defined as "a cunning, amoral, and opportunist person, especially a politician".

Definition

Political opportunism is interpreted in different ways, but usually refers to one or more of the following:

a political style of aiming to increase one's political influence at any price, or a political style that involves seizing every and any opportunity to extend political influence, whenever such opportunities arise.
the practice of abandoning or compromising in reality some important political principles that were previously held, in the process of trying to increase one's political power and influence.
a trend of thought, or a political tendency, seeking to make political capital out of situations with the main aim being that of gaining more influence, prestige or support, instead of truly winning people over to a principled position or improving their political understanding.
believing that you must know the mind of the ruler or political opponent to know what will occur. Knowing their wants, their intents, which way their mind is turning, which way they will head or where they are drawing back from of the figure in question will explain what will occur. This has explanatory value in the goings on of and of the combining of alliances, making of pacts and signing of agreements for a cause. 
a political leader may have the greatest army but without support of the people in the country or province they are invading, they will not have a victory. Victory must be achieved by winning the favor of the people.
it is easy to get excited about the possibilities of the future but the main priority should be to make decisions based on the reality, about what is happening currently and keeping a close eye on the facts. If today is not managed well, our dreams, visions and thoughts about the future will become stifled. When one does not commit to what is done but instead treats what ought to be done as ones own course, then one sooner brings one's own ruin rather than preservation. 
indulge the weaker powers in a way that does not create them any power or share power, make sure the powerful are overthrown if they pose a threat or significant opposition, do not allow foreign powers to gain a reputation or have authority in owns land. One may give people status, benefits, security, safety or wealth but let those of a lower standing earn their own power. Increasing your power in turn enfeebles others of a lesser standing, conversely increasing somebody else's power if they are of lesser standing enfeebles yourself because they can turn on you. Appeasing others to avoid conflict elevates their position which is disadvantageous for a ruler to do. Making alliances too strong may turn on you. 
don't settle on merely undermining ones enemies, one must try to overcome them and vanquish their hold of power. Treat people well or completely overcome them, anything in between could create a formidable enemy. Renewing wounds or slights every day won't keep mens mind at rest and bring them over to your side when it's time to start giving out benefits. 
people do not criticize a success story or successful leader, any means of acquiring success heaps praise upon one, but failure to do so gets blame and criticism by the press and people, that is fully deserved because it's more interesting to all people. One must strive to become a leader, get arms and be less dependent on others to be well renowned in state craft and one must acquire when one can. 

Typically, opportunist political behavior is criticized for being short-sighted or narrow-minded. That is, in the urge to make short-term political gains or preserve them, the appropriate relationship between the means being used and the overall goals being aimed for is overlooked. The result might well be, that "short term gain" leads to "long term pain". Thus, after opportunist mistakes have been made and recognized, a lot of soul searching may occur, or "a return to principles" may be advocated, so that the proper relationship between people's principles and their actions is restored.

Most politicians are "opportunists" to some extent at least (they aim to utilize political opportunities creatively to their advantage, and have to try new initiatives), but the controversies surrounding the concept concern the exact relationship between "seizing a political opportunity" and the political principles being espoused. In other words, the question is "how far you can go" without compromising principles or abandoning an agreed-on code of ethics. There may be no quick and easy answer to that, because whether a transgression has occurred cannot be verified, is known only later, or is in dispute. This happens particularly in a new situation where it is uncertain how principles should be applied, or how people should respond to it.

Accusations of "opportunism" may be made without proof being available, and they may be open to debate. In this sense, Milton Friedman remarked that "One man's opportunism is another man's statesmanship". A politician might for instance argue that, although his action seems unprincipled at first sight, when placed in a broader perspective it conforms exactly to what his constituency believes in. In an act of persuasion, he aims to convince people that his action is principled. Whether he is correct or not, may however be knowable only with the benefit of hindsight, long after the action occurred; the total effect of a strategic political decision may not be known until years or even decades after it was taken. When the outcome of an action is uncertain, a politician might argue, "History will prove me right."
Often the opportunist operates in a situation where there exist many unknowns, and where there is no broad agreement on how one should respond to the situation in a principled way. Far-sighted leadership is required, but in the absence of authoritative knowledge. In that case, whether behaviour is opportunist or not, may simply be very difficult to judge. A true opportunist is likely to utilize precisely this ambiguity to serve his purpose, capitalizing on human gullibility or ignorance.
Opportunistic behavior may occur in strategic alliances, in which one party uses the relationship to better its position, often at the expense of the other. In this case, one party puts its own interests ahead of the agreed goals of the alliance.
A political tendency that has been outmaneuvered or side-lined may latch on to any kind of opportunity to claw its way back to a position of power and influence. Conversely, a very powerful political group may use its power for opportunistic purposes because it knows that criticism of such action has no real effect (it is possible to "get away with it", i.e. the permissible).

The role of principles

The term "political opportunism" is often used in a pejorative sense, mainly because it connotes the abandonment of principles or compromising political goals. In that case, the original relationship between means and ends is lost. It may indeed be the case that means become ends in themselves, or that the ends become the means to achieve goals quite different from what was originally intended. Political principles can also be "diluted", reinterpreted or ignored, purely for the sake of promoting a contrived political unity. In consequence, a coherent rationale for being in the same organization is gradually lost; members may then drift away or the organization may decline, split or disintegrate.

In politics, it is sometimes necessary to insist on political principles, while at other times it is necessary to insist on political unity among people who differ in their beliefs or principles. Some compromises usually have to be made. If political principles were typically defined or imposed in a completely inflexible, non-negotiable way, a likely result would be sectarianism or factionalism, since few people beyond "true believers" could support a political practice based on such rigid positions.

Normally, there must be at least some freedom in how political principles are formulated, interpreted, and actually applied; if there are too many rules and principles that people have to adhere to, the result would very likely be, that they simply cannot conform to those principles in practice, or that the bewildering complexity of rules can no longer guide behaviour. In that case, all kinds of errors are likely to occur.
Normally principles are therefore understood as a guide to behaviour that assumes both some freedom for individual judgment about how they are to be applied, as well as the responsibility to apply them. If one acts "in good faith", one assumes that relevant principles will be honored in practice, and if that faith is disappointed, that is because in practice the principles were not applied consistently or appropriately.

How political principles are to be implemented is therefore usually open to some interpretation, and in part a personal responsibility. This creates the possibility that the same action is justifiable with reference to different principles, or that how a principle should be put into practice is interpreted in different ways. Just how "principled" an action is may therefore be open to dispute. Hence there is potential for deception in the way that principled behaviour, and deviation from it, is understood and justified. This becomes critically important in understanding opportunism insofar as it is a departure from principled behaviour.

Assessment

Political integrity typically demands an appropriate combination of principled positions and political flexibility that produces a morally consistent behavior in specific circumstances. Thus, whereas it may be necessary to seize a political opportunity when it presents itself, it should ideally be seized also with an appropriate motivation, and on a principled basis—which is basically what a leader of an increasingly large group aims to accomplish: to ensure that the right things are done for the right reasons.

This ideal may be difficult to honor in practice, with the result that opportunistic mistakes are made. In his famous book Rules for Radicals, community organizer Saul Alinsky for instance comments that in political organizations, quite often the right things are done for the wrong reasons, and conversely that the wrong things are done for perfectly "correct" reasons – presumably because of differentials in the existing understandings about why something is actually being done, and what the real effect of it will be. If power is wielded by means of special knowledge others don't have access to, such differentials are obviously likely to persist. This is likely to be the case, insofar as confidentiality and secrecy are necessary in politics – if the wrong people get hold of vital information, this could have unfavourable political effects. Thus, people may know "part of the story" but not the "full story" because, for political reasons, it cannot be told. The corollary is that people imagine reasons for political action that differ from the real reasons. This can get in the way of a truly principled approach to politics. In fact, Alinsky claimed that:

If "there is no such thing as an honest politician", this need not mean that all politicians are liars, but just that they are often not in a position to know or reveal the "complete picture" and thus express selected truths relevant to their actions, rather than all possible truths that could be told. In that sense, it is quite possible to be a "principled" politician – if that was not so, then (arguably) all politicians are opportunists. Yet if all politicians are opportunists—as many cynics believe—it becomes difficult to explain a politician's  professional motivations . Namely, if their purpose is based only or primarily on self-interest—disregarding higher principles, which is the hallmark of opportunism—then politics is the least likely vocation, since it requires that politicians serve a collective interest or cause bigger than themselves. They would then be better off in a line of business where they can just pursue their own interest to the full. If they are able to be politicians, they could easily do so. The question is then why they don't, if indeed only out to serve themselves.

The counter-argument to this interpretation is that politicians may start out in their career as hopeful idealists aiming to serve the community, but as soon as they become deeply entangled in political processes, they abandon their high ideals because they must reconcile many contradictory situations, and in the process begin to compromise themselves. Their political position, originally a means to a higher end, becomes an end in itself: a lifestyle.

This counter-argument may have some validity, but has not proved that the suggested political evolution is inevitable in all cases. Namely, the politician owes power only to an  ability to serve a greater cause, and the ability to represent people based on popular perceptions and trust. Therefore, the ability to serve exclusively according to self-interest is limited. At best, the counter-argument indicates that only the strongest characters can withstand the temptations of opportunist behaviour in politics, and maintain personal and political integrity. It may be not so much the politicians themselves who are opportunist, but rather their entourage: those who "climb on the political bandwagon" to profit from it for themselves. In this sense, John Keegan writes:

Few actions are intrinsically opportunist; they are opportunist in a specific context, or from a specific point of view about means-ends relationships involved. This may make an objective approach to assessing the presence of opportunism quite difficult, because it may require a lot of "inside knowledge" about the relevant circumstances and about the motives involved.

An objective, rational evaluation of whether a course of action is opportunist or not can only be stated in terms of whether the action and its motivation really did, or did not represent relevant principles (a consistency of means and ends); or whether it was motivated by self-interest or sectional interests rather than the common interest of the party (or parties) represented. Yet insofar as allegations of opportunism reflect a moral judgment, they may also contain a subjective interpretation, emotional preference or partisan viewpoint.

Sources

There are four main sources of political opportunism:

Suivisme: Some political analysts find the source of opportunism in a specific political methodology that is applied to maintain or increase political influence. An example might be so-called suivisme (a French word for political "tail-ending" or "tailism") where people try to follow and infiltrate any movement that shows signs of being popular or capturing significant support, for the purpose of gaining influence. Another version of this is sampling public opinions with surveys and focus groups to discover what they think, to contrive policies that are popular. This is usually not regarded as genuine leadership by politicians who know what they are doing, and who know what their constituency wants from personal experience. The opportunist tail-enders don't have any ideas themselves that lead to success, so they parasitize or plagiarize what others are doing in a bid to get a success. An extreme version of this is astroturfing.
Populism: this is often regarded as an intrinsically opportunist and unprincipled form of politics, catering to the "lowest common denominator". In that case, politicians advocate policies primarily on the basis that they think a lot of people will support them (and therefore useful to maintain or increase support), or that if a particular leader endorses policies, people will follow because they believe in the leader, even regardless of whether the policies are consistent with principles.
Risk management: some analysts see opportunism as originating in perceptions of the relative magnitudes of risk associated with different policy alternatives. Here, it is argued that the larger a political organization grows, and the more influence it has, the less likely it is, that it will pursue policies that could potentially result in the loss of the gains it has previously made. The bigger the political movement gets, the more is at stake. It would be more likely that an organization will compromise its principles to maintain its position than to continue pursuing its principles regardless of the consequences. Or, at the very least, the greater the political influence obtained, the more pressure exists to compromise one's political principles
Means become ends: a more general source of political opportunism is simply the great urge to achieve political success, to be successful, where success is defined as attaining a position of power, authority and influence (which in turn makes it possible to enact one's own policy). A politics is in truth successful only if the principles it advocates are really put into practice by a large number of people, or a majority of the people, in other words if people are really persuaded by an argument and act accordingly. In a principled politics, wielding power is only a means to this end: to restrain or change the behavioural patterns of citizens in ways thought to be beneficial to society. In opportunist politics, however, wielding power has become an end in itself, and the opportunist is the one who gains from it.

Dilemmas
To some extent, politics unavoidably involves dilemmas about whether to insist on one's own principles (and risk being isolated) or to adapt to a more widely held opinion for the sake of working together. People may be very unwilling to take risks and respond to opportunities, or they may take risks and opportunities without much regard for their overall significance. Accordingly, most political situations involve at least some potential for opportunism.

Thus, there may not be any generally applicable rule or technique (a "philosopher's stone") that could be invoked in advance to prevent opportunism. At best, one could be aware of the possibility that opportunism could become a real problem, and take steps to minimize the risk. Generally, that risk is minimized if people ensure that they can always explain clearly the relationship between chosen means and ends vis-a-vis the basic principles that guide them, i.e. to understand exactly why they are doing things and what motivates them.

Sometimes it is argued that opportunist errors are preferable to sectarian or factional errors. Whatever his "sins" may be interpreted to be, it is argued, the political opportunist prioritizes gaining or maintaining influence among people, and therefore at least remains among majority opinion or "among the masses". In contrast, the sectarian or factionalist is likely to uphold his principles or beliefs regardless of any experience that might contradict them, and regardless of how many people support them; he attaches supreme importance to espousing his principles with an exaggerated belief in the power of ideas, no matter what others believe. This leads to political isolation and permits little experiential verification of the validity of political ideas. Sectarianism and opportunism might however also combine, to the extent that a sect believes that almost any trick is permissible to attract more members to the sect.

Since the majority could be quite wrong in regard to particular issues, however, adapting to that majority opinion on those issues might, in a specific context, be an even bigger error than "keeping one's principles pure". This is acknowledged in democratic theory to the extent that democracy is normally thought to involve the civil right of dissent from majority opinion, and consequently also the civil right of a minority viewpoint to exist. It implies that the majority could be wrong, and that the minority could be right, something that could never be corrected efficiently, if minority viewpoints were simply silenced. Because in that case, the minority might not be able to become a majority, even if experience proved the minority correct. That is why it is especially important to evaluate criticisms of "opportunism" in context.

Drawbacks

The tragedy of opportunist politics is often that, by forsaking principles to make political gains, it becomes difficult or impossible to distinguish and evaluate political success and failure appropriately, and draw appropriate conclusions. Because for such an evaluation, it must be possible to specify clearly to what extent it has been possible to realize the agreed principles being advocated (how far a political movement has progressed toward realizing its aims). If it is not even clear anymore what those principles are, a failure may be hailed as a success, or a success decried as a failure, giving rise to intense disputes about their real significance. It may create disorientation and confusion that, in turn, opportunists use to further their aims.

If opportunist politics, in its urge for success, confuses what a political movement really stands for, or continually changes its story to suit the moment, any profound evaluation of its experiential record becomes impossible, and the past can be re-interpreted in any number of ways to suit the political purposes of the present or those of the future. In turn, that undermines the possibility of cumulative and collective learning from political experience in a truthful way. In that case, the errors and problems of the past are more likely to be repeated. Normally one would say that "if a course of action doesn't work, try something else", but if it is no longer even clear what worked and what didn't in the past, or they are mixed up with each other, current political activity may keep reproducing the problematic patterns and traditions, the essence of which the political actors are only dimly aware of.

It becomes difficult or impossible to explain why a political policy was really opted for and followed,  or what can justify it, or why what was done, was done. Political appraisals begin to look arbitrary, relativistic and subjective. And that promotes a growing discrepancy between the motives political actors said they had, and their real motives—which breeds cynicism, loss of purpose, lack of accountability, and the loss of the aspiration to work for political ideals.

According to a popular saying, "there is no such thing as an honest politician" (politicians will accentuate certain truths at the expense of other truths), but there is such a thing as a "principled" politician working within clearly defined moral boundaries, which rule out doing "just anything". A politician may be a "clever talker" who can justify anything, but if there is a big discrepancy between the talk and what is actually being done, people are usually unlikely to believe it for very long. They know that things "do not match up", even if they do not know exactly why, and may become indifferent to whatever is being said.

Continual political opportunism ultimately reduces the scope of politics to a visionless realpolitik or a barren pragmatism that may only function to maintain the status quo, and in which people deceive themselves about their own motivations and those of others. This makes life even more difficult for politicians, in their attempt to persuade people to work together for common goals. According to journalist Adam Nagourney, "Many Americans are more likely to assume that anyone they read or see on 
television has a political bias." Yet what that bias is, might not be obvious anymore. In 2009, a Pew Research Center survey found that only 29% of Americans believe that the media "gets the facts straight" and only 18% thought that media stories "deal fairly with all sides".

References

Political philosophy
Opportunism